Jangu River may refer to:

 Jangu, a tributary of the Râul Doamnei in Argeș County
 Jangu, a tributary of the Robești in Vâlcea County

See also